Egypt competed at the 1928 Summer Olympics in Amsterdam, Netherlands. 32 competitors, all men, took part in 15 events in 5 sports.

Medalists

Aquatics

Diving

Two divers, both men, represented Egypt in 1928. It was the nation's debut appearance in the sport. Farid Simaika competed in both the springboard and platform events, taking bronze in the former and silver in the latter. Simaika originally was announced as the winner of the platform contest, as his average score of 99.58 was the highest. However, the event officials then announced that 4 of the 5 judges had scored American Pete Desjardins higher than Simaika and therefore Desjardins was the winner under the rules in place at the time. 

Abdel Moneim Mokhtar competed in the platform, finishing 6th in his semifinal group and not making the top-3 cut necessary to advance to the final.

Fencing

Eight fencers, all men, represented Egypt in 1928. It was the nation's third appearance in the sport. For the first time, Egyptian fencers advanced to an event final: Cicurel placed 8th and Moyal placed 10th in the men's individual épée.

Football

Summary

 Men's tournament

Egypt competed in men's football for the 3rd time in 1928. Egypt won its first two matches before falling to Argentina in the semifinals; the team took 4th place after losing the bronze medal game as well. It was the best result in Egypt's Olympic history, improving upon the 5th place finish in 1924.

Team roster

Round of 16

Quarterfinals

Semifinals

Bronze medal match

Weightlifting

Two weightlifters, both male, represented Egypt in 1928. It was the nation's third appearance in the sport. El-Sayed Nosseir became Egypt's first Olympic champion (and first medalist of any kind) when he won the light heavyweight competition. He broke two world records (snatch and total) and the remaining two Olympic records (press and jerk) in doing so. Hussein Moukhtar competed in the middleweight, finishing 7th.

Wrestling

Four wrestlers, all men, represented Egypt in 1928. It was the nation's third appearance in the sport. Ibrahim Moustafa earned Egypt's first medal in wrestling, a gold, by winning the men's light heavyweight Greco-Roman event. He had finished 4th in the event at the 1924 Games. Moustafa's medal was only Egypt's second in any sport; he missed becoming the first Egyptian Olympic champion only because his event finished one week after El-Sayed Nosseir's weightlifting event.

Greco-Roman wrestling

References

External links
Official Olympic Reports
International Olympic Committee results database

Nations at the 1928 Summer Olympics
1928
1928 in Egyptian sport